Major Henry Astell Law, 7th Baron Ellenborough,  (11 July 1889 – 19 May 1945), was a member of the House of Lords.

Law was educated at Eton College where he was in the Eton Shooting VIII and at Royal Military Academy Sandhurst. On the death of his father, Cecil Law, 6th Baron Ellenborough, in 1931, he succeeded to the peerage.

He was commissioned as an officer into the King's Own Yorkshire Light Infantry and served in World War I. Law was awarded the Military Cross and mentioned in despatches twice for gallantry. He was promoted to the rank of Major. He was appointed one of His Majesty's Bodyguard of Honourable Corps of Gentlemen at Arms in 1934 and a Deputy Lieutenant of Dorset. Lord Ellenborough took a prominent part in the local affairs of Dorset and he did good work as Chairman to the Council for the Preservation of Rural England for the county.

Henry Astell Law married Helen Dorothy Lovatt in 1923, the only daughter of H. W. Lovatt. They had two sons: Richard Edward Cecil Law, 8th Baron Ellenborough, and the Hon. Cecil Towry Henry Law. He died in 1945.

Ancestry

References

1889 births
1945 deaths
British Army personnel of World War I
Deputy Lieutenants of Dorset
Honourable Corps of Gentlemen at Arms
King's Own Yorkshire Light Infantry officers
People educated at Eton College
Recipients of the Military Cross
Members of the British House of Lords
Henry
Eldest sons of British hereditary barons
Graduates of the Royal Military College, Sandhurst